This is a list of Superfund sites in Minnesota designated under the Comprehensive Environmental Response, Compensation, and Liability Act (CERCLA) environmental law.  The CERCLA federal law of 1980 authorized the United States Environmental Protection Agency (EPA) to create a list of polluted locations requiring a long-term response to clean up hazardous material contaminations.  These locations are known as Superfund sites, and are placed on the National Priorities List (NPL).  

The NPL guides the EPA in "determining which sites warrant further investigation" for environmental remediation.  As of May 4, 2010, there were 25 Superfund sites on the National Priorities List in Minnesota.  21 others have been cleaned up and removed from the list; none are currently proposed for addition.

Superfund sites

See also
List of Superfund sites in the United States
List of environmental issues
List of waste types
TOXMAP

References

External links

Minnesota

Superfund